
Gmina Rzepiennik Strzyżewski is a rural gmina (administrative district) in Tarnów County, Lesser Poland Voivodeship, in southern Poland.

The gmina contains part of the protected area called Ciężkowice-Rożnów Landscape Park.

Villages
Gmina Rzepiennik Strzyżewski contains the villages and settlements of Kołkówka, Olszyny, Rzepiennik Biskupi, Rzepiennik Strzyżewski, Rzepiennik Suchy and Turza.

Neighbouring gminas
Gmina Rzepiennik Strzyżewski is bordered by the gminas of Biecz, Ciężkowice, Gromnik, Moszczenica, Szerzyny and Tuchów.

References
Polish official population figures 2006

Rzepiennik Strzyzewski
Tarnów County